Kamares (Greek: Καμάρες, "arches") may refer to the following places: 

in Cyprus:
the Kamares aqueduct in Larnaca

in Greece:
Kamares, Achaea, a town in the northern part of Achaea
Kamares, Crete, a village in the southern part of the Heraklion regional unit, Crete
Kamares, Sifnos, a village on the island of Sifnos
Kamares, Laconia, a village in the municipal unit Gytheio, Laconia
the Kavala aqueduct, popularly known as Kamares

in Turkey:
the Greek name for the village at the site of the ancient city of Parium